This is a list of notable squash and pumpkin dishes that are prepared using squash and pumpkin as a primary ingredient. Pumpkin is a squash cultivar.

Squash and pumpkin dishes and foods

 Hobak-juk – a Korean variety of juk (porridge) made with pumpkin and glutinous rice flour. It is a smooth and naturally sweet porridge that is traditionally served to the elderly or recovering patients.
 Hobak-tteok – a Korean dish and variety of siru-tteok (steamed rice cake) made by mixing fresh or dried pumpkin with glutinous or non-glutinous rice flour, then steaming the mixture in a siru (rice cake steamer).
 Kabak tatlısı – a Turkish pumpkin dessert made by cooking peeled and cut pumpkin that has been sprinkled with sugar (candied pumpkin).
 Kadu bouranee – an Afghan and Turkish dish made by frying pumpkin with different spices
 Maraq – a Somali soup that is sometimes prepared using pumpkin
 Mashed pumpkin – a vegetable dish made by cooking or macerating the skinless flesh (pulp) of pumpkins and then mashing, straining, grinding, or puréeing until the desired consistency is achieved. It is traditionally served as a side dish, although it has many uses in cooking and baking.
 Pumpkin bread – a type of moist quick bread made with pumpkin.
 Pumpkin seed – a snack food typically consisting of roasted seeds, they are also used as an ingredient in some dishes, such as mole.
 Pumpkin seed oil – has an intense nutty taste and is rich in polyunsaturated fatty acids, it is sometimes used as a salad dressing. The typical Styrian dressing consists of pumpkin seed oil and cider vinegar. The oil is also used for desserts, giving ordinary vanilla ice cream a nutty taste.
 Spaghetti alla Nerano – an Italian pasta dish prepared using pasta, fried zucchinis and provolone del Monaco (or caciocavallo).
 Stuffed squash – consists of various kinds of squash or zucchini stuffed with rice and sometimes meat and cooked on the stovetop or in the oven. 
 Ghapama – an Armenian stuffed pumpkin dish that often prepared during the Christmas season, it is typically stuffed with rice and dried fruits.
 Stuffed pumpkin – consists of pumpkin that has been stuffed with various ingredients and roasted or baked, it is a dish in American cuisine.
 Wolgwa-chae

Desserts and sweets

 Bundevara – a Serbian sweet pie made of rolled phyllo or similar to strudel, filled with sweetened grated pumpkin pulp and baked in an oven.
 Fakthong kaeng buat – a Thai dish consisting of pumpkin in coconut cream
 Poke – a dessert from the Cook Islands and French Polynesia that prepared using pumpkin or bananas.
 Picarones – a Peruvian dessert with principal ingredients of squash and sweet potato, it is served in a doughnut form and covered with syrup, made from chancaca (solidified molasses).
 Pumpkin-coconut custard – a dessert dish consisting of a coconut custard steam-baked in a pumpkin or kabocha
 Pumpkin pie – a dessert pie with a spiced, pumpkin-based custard filling
 Butternut Pumpkin jam or murabba–is a butternut pumpkin-based sweet fruit preserve in Tabriz, Iranian Azerbaijan

Soups and stews
 Quibebe – a winter squash stew from South America
 Squash soup – a soup prepared using various types of squash as a primary ingredient
 Pumpkin soup – various preparations of the dish are known in many European countries, the United States and other areas of North America, and in Australia.
 Soup joumou – a mildly spicy soup native to Haitian cuisine that is traditionally based on a large winter squash that resembles a pumpkin.

Beverages
 Pumpkin ale and beer – the brewing of beer with pumpkin in the United States has been dated back to at least 1771.

Gallery

See also

 Candy pumpkin
 List of fruit dishes
 List of gourds and squashes
 List of vegetable dishes
 Pumpkin pie spice
 Pumpkin Spice Latte

Notes

References

External links
 
 

 
Lists of foods by ingredient